Braslava Parish is an administrative unit of Limbaži Municipality, Latvia. It was an administrative unit of Limbaži District. The administrative center is Vilzēni village.

Towns, villages and settlements of Braslava parish 
Braslava
Klāmaņi
Urga
Vilzēni
Vilzēnmuiža

External links 

Parishes of Latvia
Limbaži Municipality
Vidzeme